The Woods is a Polish mystery thriller television miniseries, based on the 2007 novel of the same name by Harlan Coben. The series premiered on Netflix on 12 June 2020. It is the second Polish-language series produced for Netflix, after 1983.

Synopsis
The story unfolds in two different time periods: August 1994 and September 2019. In 2019, Warsaw prosecutor Paweł Kopiński is called upon to identify the body of a murder victim who was found with newspaper clippings about him. The murder seems to be linked to the August 1994 summer camp where Paweł was a chaperone, during which two people were murdered and two others—including his sister Kamila—went missing without a trace.

Cast

Main
 Grzegorz Damięcki as Paweł Kopiński (2019)
 Agnieszka Grochowska as Laura Goldsztajn (2019)
 Hubert Miłkowski as Paweł Kopiński (1994)
 Wiktoria Filus as Laura Goldsztajn (1994)
 Jacek Koman as Dawid Goldsztajn
 Ewa Skibińska as Natalia Kopińska
 Magdalena Czerwińska as Małgorzata Tatarczuk
 Adam Ferency as Policeman in charge of the case in 1994
 Przemysław Bluszcz as Bogdan Perkowski
 Dorota Kolak as Chief Prosecutor Herman
 Izabela Dąbrowska as Bożena Perkowska

Recurring
 Piotr Głowacki as Inspector Kosiński
 Cezary Pazura as Krzysztof Dunaj-Szafrański
 Arkadiusz Jakubik as Inspector Maciej Jork
 Adam Wietrzyński as Artur Perkowski
 Jakub Gola as Daniel Kotler
 Martyna Byczkowska as Kamila Kopińska
 Kinga Jasik as Monika Sowik
 Krzysztof Zarzecki as Wojciech Malczak

Episodes

Production
In August 2018, Netflix signed a five-year contract to adapt fourteen crime novels by Harlan Coben. In December 2019, ATM Grupa announced that it had wrapped up filming of the series and that it would be released on Netflix in 2020.  The Woods is the second Polish-language series made for the streaming platform and the fourth Netflix production created by Coben, following The Five, Safe, and The Stranger.

References

External links
 
 

2020 Polish television series debuts
2020 Polish television series endings
2020s crime drama television series
2020s mystery television series
2020s Polish television series
2020s television miniseries
Crime thriller television series
Polish crime television series
Polish drama television series
Polish-language Netflix original programming
Television shows based on American novels
Television series set in 1994
Television series set in 2019
Television shows set in Warsaw
Television series about prosecutors